Surinam is a village located in the Savanne District of Mauritius. According to the Statistics Mauritius census in 2011, the population was 10,507.

Nightingale College was a college in Surinam, Mauritius founded on 1 July 1964 by Seewooparsad Goolab. It was first located at Dr Sauzier's residence in Souillac. In 1965 it moved to L'Eglise St Jacques and in 1968 to a location near Souillac Hospital. It moved to Royal Road, Surinam in March 1970, where it remained until its takeover by the Ministry of Education.

See also 
 Districts of Mauritius
 List of places in Mauritius

References 

Savanne District
Populated places in Mauritius
Schools in Mauritius